This following is list of awards and honors received by Donald Trump, the 45th president of the United States.

Academic degrees 
Honorary
Liberty University - Doctor of Business Administration (2012)
Liberty University - Doctor of Laws (2017) 

Honorary (Revoked)
Robert Gordon University - Doctor of Business Administration  (conferred 2010; revoked 2015)
Lehigh University - Doctor of Laws (conferred 1988; revoked 2021)
Wagner College - Doctor of humane letters  (conferred 2004; rescinded 2021)

Awards and honors 

Organizational
 Humanitarian Award by the National Jewish Health (1976)
 Tree of Life Award by the Jewish National Fund (1983)
 Ellis Island Medal of Honor for his work as a successful developer in New York City (1986)
 President's Medal by the Freedom Foundation for his support of youth programs (1995)
 Muhammad Ali Entrepreneur Award (2007)
 Unicorn Children's Foundation Shining Star Award (2008)
 Palm Tree Award by the Palm Beach Police Foundation (2010)
Presidential Hero Award by the Lois Pope LIFE Foundation (2011)
 The Algemeiner Liberty Award for contributions to Israel–United States relations (2015)
 Marine Corps–Law Enforcement Foundation Commandant's Leadership Award (2015)
 Friends of Zion Award by The Friends of Zion Museum (2017)
 Wounded Warrior Project Award in commemoration of Trump's support for the group during the 2018 Soldier Ride (2018)
 Bipartisan Justice Award for signing the First Step Act into law (2019)
 Ig Nobel Prize (2020)
Halls of Fame

 Gaming Hall of Fame (1995)
 Star on the Hollywood Walk of Fame at 6801 Hollywood Boulevard in the Television Category (2007)
 WWE Hall of Fame (2013)
 New Jersey Boxing Hall of Fame (2015)
 Atlantic City Boxing Hall of Fame (2018)
Media
 Time Person of the Year (2016)
 Financial Times Person of the Year (2016)
 Sports Business Journal Most Influential Person in Sports Business (2017)
 Two-time Gallup Poll Most Admired Man (2019 - shared with Barack Obama, 2020)
State/Local
 Kentucky Colonel from Kentucky (2012)
International
 Presidential Order of Excellence from the nation of Georgia (2012)
 Collar of The Order of Abdulaziz al Saud from Saudi Arabia (2017)
 Donald J. Trump Boulevard named in the suburb of Kamez north of Tirana, Albania and honorary citizen of Kamez, Tirana, Albania (2017)
 Temple Coin featuring Trump (alongside King Cyrus) from the Mikdash Educational Center in honor of Trump recognizing Jerusalem as the country's capital (2018)
 Medal of Bravery, from the Afghan people by Logar Province (2018)
 Trump Heights, Golan Heights, Israel. Golan Eagle placed adjacent to the entrance to Trump Heights in honor of Donald J. Trump (2020)
 Trump Square in Petah Tikva, Israel, named in honour of Donald Trump for recognizing Jerusalem as the country's capital (2019)
 Order of Freedom from Kosovo (2020)
 Order of Muhammad from Morocco (2021)

Notes

References

Awards and honors
Trump
Awards and honors